Stelios Halkias (born 11 April 1980) is a Greek chess player. He was awarded the title of Grandmaster (GM) by FIDE in 2002.

Chess career
He has represented his country in a number of Chess Olympiads, including 2000, 2002, 2004, 2006, 2008, 2010 and 2012.

He played in the Chess World Cup 2011, losing to Alexander Morozevich in the first round.

References

External links 
 
 Stelios Halkiasv chess games at 365Chess.com
 

1980 births
Living people
Chess grandmasters
Greek chess players
Chess Olympiad competitors
Sportspeople from Thessaloniki
21st-century Greek people